Raymond M. Burse is a college administrator, Harvard educated lawyer, and businessman who served two terms as the ninth and fourteenth President of Kentucky State University.

Burse attended Centre College in Danville, Kentucky where he majored in chemistry and mathematics. He was initiated into Omicron Delta Kappa - The National Leadership Honor Society in 1972.

His first tenure at Kentucky State University took place from 1982 to 1989, and his second tenure took place from 2014 until his resignation on May 23, 2016. He is known for taking a $90,000 a year pay cut from his $350,000 salary so that his fellow employees could be paid a living wage.  Burse spent a decade as a senior executive at General Electric. He is from Hopkinsville, Kentucky, and resides in Louisville. Burse is currently serving on the board of trustees of the University of Louisville, after being appointed by Kentucky Governor Matt Bevin.

Burse was awarded a Rhodes Scholarship and studied at Oxford University for two years. He was the first African American to compete in an Oxford vs. Cambridge rugby match. He played wing for Oxford which lost 16–15. His achievement earned him a mention in Faces in the Crowd in the January 27, 1975 issue of Sports Illustrated. He is the father of three sons, the oldest of whom is Ray Burse.

In 2016 Burse was honored with the Laurel Crowned Circle Award, the highest award from Omicron Delta Kappa.

References

African-American academics
American academic administrators
Centre College alumni
General Electric employees
Harvard Law School alumni
Heads of universities and colleges in the United States
Kentucky State University faculty
Living people
Oxford University RFC players
Place of birth missing (living people)
Year of birth missing (living people)
21st-century African-American people